is one of the Expressways of Japan from Tosu to  Nagasaki.  It runs through the prefecture of Saga, and the southern half of the Nagasaki prefecture. The total length is 120.4 km.

History
 November 16, 1973, Tosu Interchange and Junction with the Kyushu Expressway to Nankan was open to traffic.
 November 17, 1982, a section from Nagasaki-Tarami to Omura Interchanges was opened to traffic.
 March 28, 1985, a section from Saga-Yamato to Tosu Interchanges was opened to traffic.
 February 5, 1987, the Tosu Junction in the east was opened.
 March 18, 1987, a section from Takeo-Kitagata to Saga-Yamato Interchanges was opened to traffic.
 January 26, 1990, a section from Omura to Takeo-Kitagata was opened to traffic which made the Nagasaki Expressway from Tosu to Nagasaki fully accessible with no gaps. 
 January 26, 1990, the Takeo Junction was opened to traffic with another freeway.
 December 18, 1997, the tunnel from Higashisonogi to Ureshino Interchanges which made Nagasaki Expressway with four lanes. 
 March 24, 2001, the Sagan Cross Bridge in the Tosu Junction was opened to traffic which made access to the bridge with the Kyushu Expressway.
 March 27, 2004, a section from Nagasaki to Nagasaki-Tarami Interchanges was opened with other freeway.
 June 28, 2019, a section from Nagasaki-Tarami to Nagasaki-Susukizuka Interchanges which made Nagasaki Expressway with four lanes.
 November 27, 2019, the Tawarazaka tunnel is mentioned in the Zombie Land Saga song "Saga Jihen".

Interchanges 

 IC - interchange, JCT - junction, SA - service area, PA - parking area, BS - bus stop, TN - tunnel, BR - bridge, TB - toll gate
 Bus stops labeled "○" are currently in use; those marked "◆" are closed.

Lanes

 4-lane, Tosu Junction to Nagasaki-Susukizuka Interchanges
 2-lane, Nagasaki-Susukizuka to Nagasaki Interchanges

References

Expressways in Japan
Kyushu region
Roads in Nagasaki Prefecture
Roads in Saga Prefecture